Helene Holzman (30 August 1891 in Jena – 25 August 1968) was a German painter and writer. She spent time in a concentration camp. She posthumously won the Geschwister-Scholl-Preis for the memoir Dies Kind Soll Leben (This Child Must Live).

References

External links
 Helene Holzman – her activity to save Jews' lives during the Holocaust, at Yad Vashem website

1891 births
1968 deaths
Nazi concentration camp survivors
German Righteous Among the Nations
20th-century German women writers
German memoirists